General George may refer to:

Harold Huston George (1892–1942), U.S. Air Force brigadier general
Harold L. George (1893–1986), U.S. Air Force lieutenant general
Randy George (fl. 1980s–2020s), U.S. Army lieutenant general

See also
John St George (1812–1891), British Army general
Johann Georg, Chevalier de Saxe (1704–1774), Saxon Army general